Dolichometra is a monotypic genus of flowering plants in the family Rubiaceae. The genus contains only one species, viz. Dolichometra leucantha, which is endemic to the East Usambara Mountains in Tanzania.

References

Monotypic Rubiaceae genera